This is a list of airports in Palau, sorted by location.

The Republic of Palau, is an island nation in the Pacific Ocean. It emerged from United Nations trusteeship (administered by the United States) in 1994. It is one of the world's youngest and smallest sovereign states. In English, the name is sometimes spelled Belau in accordance with the native pronunciation.



Airports 

Airport names shown in bold indicate the airport has scheduled service on commercial airlines.

See also 
 Transport in Palau
 List of airports by ICAO code: P#PT - Federated States of Micronesia, Palau
 Wikipedia:WikiProject Aviation/Airline destination lists: Oceania#Palau

References 
 
  - includes IATA codes
 Great Circle Mapper: Airports in Palau - ICAO, IATA, FAA codes
 AirNav: Airports in Palau - FAA and ICAO codes
  - Palau International Airport
  - Palau Bureau of Aviation

Footnotes

Palau
 
Palau
Airports
Airports